Hurrah is a 1998 Australian film directed by Frank Shields about a man living on his own in an isolated farm property who is visited by a mysterious woman.

References

External links

Hurrah at BFI

Australian drama films
1998 films
1990s English-language films
Films directed by Frank Shields
1990s Australian films